Joo-hyun, also spelled Joo-hyeon or Ju-hyun, is a Korean given name, that is a unisex name. Its meaning differs based on the hanja used to write each syllable of the name. There are 56 hanja with the reading "joo" and 35 hanja with the reading "hyun" on the South Korean government's official list of hanja which may be registered for use in given names.

People
People with this name include:

Entertainers
 Noh Joo-hyun (born Noh Un-young, 1946), South Korean actor
 Ock Joo-hyun (born 1980), South Korean musical theatre actress and pop singer, member of the girl group Fin.K.L
 Kim Joo-hyun (born 1987), South Korean actress
 Seohyun (born Seo Joo-hyun, 1991), South Korean female singer, member of girl group Girls' Generation
 Irene (singer) (born Bae Joo-hyun, 1991), South Korean female singer, member of girl group Red Velvet

Sportspeople
 Baek Joo-hyun (born 1984), South Korean male association football midfielder
 Park Joo-hyun (footballer) (born 1984), South Korean male association football forward 
 Oh Ju-hyun (born 1987), South Korean male association football midfielder
 Jung Joo-hyun (born 1990), South Korean male baseball player
 Lee Joo-hyun (born 1974), South Korea-born USA badminton player

See also
List of Korean given names

References